Attorney General Higgins may refer to:

H. B. Higgins (1851–1929), Attorney-General of Australia
William J. Higgins (1880–1943), Attorney-General of the Dominion of Newfoundland

See also
General Higgins (disambiguation)